Habrocerus capillaricornis is a species of rove beetle in the family Staphylinidae.

References

Further reading

External links

 

Staphylinidae
Beetles described in 1806